Joe Erich (fl. 1850–1865) was an American criminal fence and early underworld figure in New York City during the 1850s and 1860s. Based from Manhattan's Maiden Lane, Erich associated with many criminals and burglars of the era including Jack Spratt, Jack Adams, Tom Gordon, Tom Kelley, Jim Brady, Bowlegged Moore, Johnny Miller, Jim Painter, Amos Leeds, Bill Smith, Dick Collard, Jack Cooper and others.

By 1855, he had become one of the sought after fences in the United States dealing with professional criminals throughout the country. Unlike the later rivalries of his successors John D. "Travelling Mike" Grady and Fredericka "Marm" Mandelbaum, he often worked with his principal competitor Ephraim Snow who operated a dry goods store on Grand and Allen Streets.

References

Further reading
Johnson, David R. Policing the Urban Underworld: The Impact of Crime on the Development of the American Police, 1800-1887. Philadelphia: Temple University Press, 1979.

Year of birth missing
Year of death missing
Criminals from New York City
People from Manhattan